On 8 September 2022, at 15:10 BST, Elizabeth II, Queen of the United Kingdom and the other Commonwealth realms, and the longest-reigning British monarch, died of old age at Balmoral Castle in Aberdeenshire, Scotland, at the age of 96. The Queen's death was publicly announced at 18:30. She was succeeded by her eldest son, Charles III.

The death of the Queen set in motion Operation London Bridge, a collection of plans including arrangements for her state funeral, and supported by Operation Unicorn, which set protocols for her death occurring in Scotland. The United Kingdom observed a national mourning period of 10 days. The Queen's lying in state took place in Westminster Hall from 14 to 19 September, during which time an estimated 250,000 people queued to pay their respects.

The Queen's state funeral on 19 September was the first held in Britain since that of Winston Churchill in 1965. A funeral service was held at Westminster Abbey, followed by a procession to Wellington Arch that featured around 3,000 military personnel and was watched by around a million people in central London. The state hearse then transported the Queen's coffin to Windsor, followed by another procession through Windsor Great Park and a committal service at St George's Chapel at Windsor Castle. The Queen was interred with her husband Philip in the King George VI Memorial Chapel later that evening, in a private service attended only by her closest family. 

The occasion of the Queen's state funeral was a public holiday in the UK and several Commonwealth states. The state funeral was one of the United Kingdom's most watched special television broadcasts, surpassing the wedding of Prince William and Catherine Middleton, the previous most watched royal event of the 21st century.

Background
The Queen was in good health for most of her life; her health, however, declined after the death of her husband, Prince Philip, on 9 April 2021. She began to use a walking stick for public engagements in October 2021. On 20 October, the Queen stayed overnight in King Edward VII's Hospital in central London, necessitating the cancellation of scheduled visits to Northern Ireland and the COP26 summit in Glasgow. She suffered a sprained back in November, which prevented her from attending the 2021 National Service of Remembrance.

In February 2022, during the COVID-19 pandemic in England, the Queen was one of several people at Windsor Castle to test positive for COVID-19. Her symptoms were described as mild and cold-like, and she later commented that the disease "does leave one very tired and exhausted". The monarch's health became a cause of concern to commentators at this time.

The Queen was said to be feeling well enough to resume her official duties by 1 March 2022 and attended the service of thanksgiving for Prince Philip at Westminster Abbey on 29 March. Despite this, the Queen did not attend several appointments over the following months, including the annual Commonwealth Day service in March, the Royal Maundy service in April, the State Opening of Parliament in May, and the National Service of Thanksgiving for her Platinum Jubilee in June. During the Jubilee the Queen also suffered "discomfort" after standing during Trooping the Colour and was largely confined to balcony appearances during the celebrations. According to her Apothecary in Scotland, Dr Douglas Glass, there had been private concerns about her health for several months before her death; he was quoted in a later biography as saying "It was expected and we were quite aware of what was going to happen."

Two days before her death, on 6 September 2022, the Queen accepted the resignation of Boris Johnson and appointed Liz Truss to succeed him as Prime Minister of the United Kingdom; these meetings took place at Balmoral Castle, rather than their usual location, Buckingham Palace. On 7 September, the Queen was scheduled to attend an online meeting of the Privy Council of the United Kingdom to swear in new ministers in Truss's government, but this was cancelled after she was advised by doctors to rest. The Queen's final public statement, issued that same day, was a message of condolences for the victims of a mass stabbing incident in Saskatchewan, Canada.

Death and national mourning

Death and announcement 

The Queen died at 15:10 BST on 8 September 2022 at the age of 96, ending her 70-year reign. According to her death certificate, which was made public on 29 September, she died of old age. Her death was publicly announced at 18:30. Elizabeth II was the first monarch to die in Scotland since James V of Scotland in 1542.

Members of the royal family travelled to Balmoral Castle throughout the day. Prince Charles arrived at 10:30 and was met by Princess Anne, who was already staying with the Queen. Camilla, Duchess of Cornwall, also travelled to Balmoral from the Birkhall estate. Charles and Anne were by the Queen's side when she died. Prince William, Prince Andrew, Prince Edward, and Sophie, Countess of Wessex, left RAF Northolt on a flight to Aberdeen Airport and arrived at Balmoral shortly after 17:00; Prince Harry, who had travelled alone and departed later than the other family members, arrived at Balmoral at 20:00; Catherine, Duchess of Cambridge and Meghan, Duchess of Sussex did not join them.

Prime Minister Liz Truss is believed to have been informed of the Queen's declining health that morning by the Cabinet Secretary, Simon Case, and received an update at 12:00. The Leader of the Opposition, Sir Keir Starmer, was informed by a note passed to him by Deputy Leader Angela Rayner during a speech he was giving in the House of Commons. At 12:30 Buckingham Palace made a public announcement expressing concern for the Queen's health; the Speaker, Sir Lindsay Hoyle, made a brief statement of good wishes in response.

Truss was informed at 16:30 that the Queen had died, and the royal family announced her death two hours later via newswires and a post on Twitter. A notice with the same statement was affixed to the railings outside Buckingham Palace and posted on the royal family website.
BBC One continuously covered the Queen's condition from 12:40, after the first official statement; special reports were also run on ITV, Channel 4, and Channel 5. British television announcements of the Queen's death began at 18:31, when news presenter Huw Edwards read the royal family's statement during a live broadcast on the BBC News channel and BBC One. At 18:32 the presenters of BBC Radio 4 and BBC Radio 5 Live made similar announcements. At around 18:36 all BBC Radio stations had interrupted programming with a news report read by Chris Aldridge to announce the Queen's death.

After the announcement, the Union Flags at Buckingham Palace and 10 Downing Street were lowered to half-mast. At Balmoral Castle the Royal Standard of the United Kingdom was lowered and then, because the new king was present, was raised again. The Royal Banner of Scotland was lowered to half-mast at the Palace of Holyroodhouse, as was the Welsh flag at Cardiff Castle. Crowds gathered outside royal residences, and rainbows were seen above Buckingham Palace and Windsor Castle.

Scottish events 
That the Queen died in Scotland meant that Operation Unicorn was the first part of Operation London Bridge to take effect. Her body was taken to Edinburgh, where ceremonies were held, then to London for the state funeral.

The Queen's coffin left Balmoral Castle at 10:46 on 11 September, draped with the Scottish version of the Royal Standard of the United Kingdom and topped with a wreath of flowers from the castle gardens. People lined the route of the cortege to pay their respects, and in Aberdeenshire farmers formed a guard of honour of tractors. The cortege reached the Palace of Holyroodhouse at 16:23 and the coffin was placed in the Throne Room. The coffin was made from oak and was lined with lead, reportedly weighing . 
On 12 September the Queen's coffin was carried up the Royal Mile to St Giles' Cathedral, in a procession that included the King, Princess Anne and Timothy Laurence, Prince Andrew, Prince Edward, the Bearer Party from the Royal Regiment of Scotland, and the Royal Company of Archers. The Queen consort and the Countess of Wessex and Forfar followed closely in their car. Guns were fired every minute from Edinburgh Castle during the procession. On arrival the coffin was carried into the cathedral, and the Crown of Scotland was placed on it.

A service of thanksgiving was then held to celebrate the Queen's life and to highlight her association with Scotland. The service was led by the minister of St Giles' Cathedral, the Reverend Calum Macleod, and the homily given by the Moderator of the General Assembly of the Church of Scotland, the Reverend Dr Iain Greenshields. Psalm 118 was sung in Gaelic by Karen Matheson. It was attended by the royal party; politicians, including Liz Truss and Nicola Sturgeon; and representatives from the Queen's Scottish charities and organisations.

The Queen's coffin lay at rest at the cathedral for 24 hours, guarded by the Royal Company of Archers, which allowed around 33,000 people to file past the coffin. In the evening the King, Princess Anne, Prince Andrew, and Prince Edward held a vigil at the cathedral, a custom known as the Vigil of the Princes; Princess Anne was the first woman to participate.

On 13 September the Queen's coffin was taken by hearse to Edinburgh Airport and flown to RAF Northolt on a Royal Air Force C-17 Globemaster, accompanied by Princess Anne and Sir Timothy Laurence. The Royal Air Force Bearer Party carried the coffin onto the aircraft and a Guard of Honour was formed by the Royal Regiment of Scotland. During the journey the Scottish version of the Royal Standard that draped the coffin was replaced by the Royal Standard that is used in the remainder of the United Kingdom.

Lying-in-state 
Upon the Queen's arrival in London, she was transported to Buckingham Palace, before being moved to Westminster Hall the following day for her lying-in-state before the state funeral.

When the Queen arrived at RAF Northolt the Queen's Colour Squadron (63 Squadron RAF Regiment) assumed the role of the Bearer Party and formed the Guard of Honour. The coffin was placed in the state hearse and transported through London to Buckingham Palace, with people lining the street to watch. The coffin was then placed in the Bow Room at Buckingham Palace in the presence of the royal family.

The Queen's coffin was taken in a military procession from Buckingham Palace to Westminster Hall on a horse-drawn gun carriage of the King's Troop Royal Horse Artillery. The King, male members of the royal family, and Princess Anne followed the coffin on foot. This procession, as well the other processions held later in London and Windsor, marched at the funeral pace of 75 steps per minute and was accompanied by military bands playing marches by Johann Heinrich Walch, Felix Mendelssohn and Frédéric Chopin. Big Ben tolled each minute of the procession and minute guns were fired from Hyde Park by the King's Troop Royal Horse Artillery.

Members of the three armed forces formed a guard of honour to receive the coffin at Parliament Square, after which soldiers from the Queen's Company, 1st Battalion Grenadier Guards, placed the coffin on a catafalque in Westminster Hall. The Archbishop of Canterbury and the Dean of Westminster then conducted a service in the presence of the royal family.

The Queen lay in state in Westminster Hall from 17:00 on 14 September to 06:30 on 19 September. The coffin was guarded by members of both the Sovereign's Bodyguard and the Household Division. The Imperial State Crown and a wreath of flowers and foliage from Balmoral and Windsor castles had been placed on the coffin before the procession, and to these were added the Sovereign's Orb and the Sovereign's Sceptre with Cross; the Wanamaker Cross of Westminster was placed at its head and the regimental flag of The Queen's Company of The Grenadier Guards at its foot. An estimated 250,000 members of the public filed past the coffin, as did politicians and other public figures. Both the BBC and ITV offered a livestream of the Queen lying-in-state. On 16 September, a 28-year-old man was arrested under the Public Order Act after he ran from the queue inside Westminster Hall and touched the coffin.

In the evening of 16 September the King and his siblings held a vigil around the Queen's coffin for approximately ten minutes, and on 17 September the Queen's eight grandchildren did the same. Prince Andrew and Prince Harry were permitted to wear military uniform on these occasions, who as non-working royals had not done at previous ceremonial events.

On 18 September, pipers at four different locations in Scotland played "The Immortal Memory" at 18:00. At 20:00 a minute's silence was observed across the UK.

The Queue 

Two queues were formed to view the lying-in-state, beginning 48 hours before Westminster Hall opened to the public. This queue attracted much media attention, with many commentators noting the stereotype that British people are good at queueing. The accessible queue, for people with a disability or long-term condition, operated a ticket system and was therefore shorter.

The queue experience was generally perceived to be positive, however there was an allegation of a man committing sexual assault by exposing himself, and some heckling of queuers. The London Ambulance Service also had to assist 710 people, mainly due to head injuries from fainting.

State funeral

Planning

Plans for the Queen's death had existed in some form since the 1960s, and the Queen was consulted about all the details included in her funeral plan. The Earl Marshal was in charge of organising the event.

The planning and complexity of the funeral was compared to that of Winston Churchill in 1965, the last state funeral held in Britain and also a major international event. It marked the first time that a monarch's funeral service had been held at Westminster Abbey since George II in 1760. The Foreign Office handled the invitations, communications, and security arrangements from a headquarters called "The Hangar", redeploying 300 staff to manage the task. 500 foreign dignitaries and heads of state were expected to attend. Invitations were issued to every country with which Britain maintains diplomatic relations, except for Russia, Belarus, and Myanmar; Syria, Venezuela and Afghanistan were not invited. The timing of the funeral allowed guests who planned to address the general debate of the UN General Assembly the following day sufficient time to fly to New York City.

The day of the funeral was a bank holiday in the United Kingdom. Many businesses, workplaces, and educational establishments closed for the day, including major supermarkets and the London Stock Exchange. In the National Health Service several trusts chose to cancel or reschedule all non-urgent appointments. Several food banks announced that they would close on the day of the funeral, though some remained open after facing public backlash.

Hotel prices increased in the days before the funeral in London. Extra train services were made available across the country to allow people to travel to and from London and pay their respects for the lying-in-state and funeral service. Westminster City Council deployed its "Clean Streets" team to clean up different areas within central London.

Procession to Westminster Abbey

At 10:44 on 19 September the Queen's coffin was moved from Westminster Hall to Westminster Abbey on the State Gun Carriage of the Royal Navy. The carriage was drawn by Royal Navy sailors, known as Naval Ratings, maintaining a tradition which began at the state funeral of Queen Victoria. The King, members of the royal family, and members of the King's household walked behind. Non-working royals, including the Duke of York and the Duke of Sussex, did not wear military uniforms for the state funeral and the committal service. A wreath with foliage cut from the gardens of Buckingham Palace, Highgrove House, and Clarence House was placed on the coffin, together with a note from the King which read "In loving and devoted memory. Charles R." Before the service the tenor bell of the Abbey rang once a minute for 96 minutes, once for each year of the Queen's life. The coffin arrived at Westminster Abbey at 10:52.

Funeral service
Music by British composers was played before the service, and as the coffin entered the abbey the choir sang the five sentences set to music. The service began at 11:00 and was conducted by the Dean of Westminster, David Hoyle, according to the 1662 Book of Common Prayer. The lessons were read by Baroness Scotland, Secretary General of the Commonwealth, and Liz Truss, Prime Minister of the United Kingdom, and the sermon and commendation were given by the Archbishop of Canterbury Justin Welby. Prayers were said by clergy from several Christian denominations.

The music included the psalm setting "Like as the hart" by Judith Weir and the anthem "Who shall separate us?" by James MacMillan, both written for the funeral, as well as pieces performed at the Queen's coronation and wedding. The Choir of Westminster Abbey and Choir of the Chapel Royal led the singing, and were conducted by James O'Donell.

The end of the service included a sounding of the "Last Post" and a two-minute silence, which was concluded with the "Reveille". The National Anthem, followed by the bagpipe lament "Sleep, dearie, sleep", marked the end of the ceremony. The "Allegro maestoso" from Elgar's Organ Sonata in G was played after the service.

Processions in London and Windsor 

Two processions followed the service. The first was from Westminster Abbey to Wellington Arch, where the Queen's coffin was placed in the state hearse. From there it was transported to Windsor, where the second procession took place through Windsor Great Park.

The procession in London began at 12:15 and included around 3,000 military personnel, stretching for over a mile. It began at the abbey and passed down Whitehall, through Horse Guards, up The Mall, past Buckingham Palace, and up Constitution Hill to end at the Wellington Arch near Hyde Park. Around a million people lined the streets of central London to watch the event.

At the front of the procession were representatives of Commonwealth forces led by members of the Royal Canadian Mounted Police on horseback, then representatives of the Royal Air Force, the British Army, and the Royal Navy and Royal Marines, followed by defence staff and armed forces chaplains, officers of arms, and the royal household. The Queen's coffin followed, again on the State Gun Carriage pulled by Royal Navy sailors, and surrounded by an escort party. The King and royal family members were next, some marching and some in cars, with a further escort and the household of the former Prince of Wales behind. At the rear of the procession were representatives of civilian services.

Seven military bands were dispersed through the procession and again played funeral marches. Big Ben tolled each minute and minute guns were fired from Hyde Park by the King's Troop Royal Horse Artillery. Standards were lowered and those in the procession gave salutes as they passed the Cenotaph. At Buckingham Palace, the King's Guard gave a royal salute to the Victoria Memorial and Palace staff waited outside the gates. At Wellington Arch the coffin was transferred with a royal salute to the state hearse for the journey to Windsor. The hearse left London for Windsor at 13:30, accompanied by Princess Anne and Timothy Laurence, travelling on A roads rather than motorways to allow the public to line the route.

At 15:00 the coffin arrived in Windsor, where a final procession involving 1,000 military personnel took place down the Long Walk to St George's Chapel. Around 97,000 people lined the route. The Queen's fell pony, Emma, and two royal corgis, Muick and Sandy, stood at the side of the procession. The King and royal family joined the procession in the Quadrangle, during which Sebastopol Bell and the Curfew Tower bell tolled and the King's Troop, Royal Horse Artillery, fired minute guns from the East Lawn of the castle. At the end of the procession the coffin was taken to St George's Chapel via the West Steps with the guard of honour formed by the 1st Battalion Grenadier Guards.

Committal service
The committal service began at 16:00 in the presence of 800 guests, largely made up of the royal household and staff from the Queen's private estates, but also including the royal family, governors general and prime ministers from the Commonwealth realms, and members of foreign royal houses. The Choir of St George's Chapel led the music, which included the Russian "Kontakion of the Departed", also sung at the funeral of Prince Philip. A selection of music was also played before the service.

The Dean of Windsor, who conducted the service, read the bidding, the readings, and the commendation. The first reading was Revelation 21, verses 1–7, which was also included in the order of service for the funerals of Elizabeth's grandparents and father. The Rector of Sandringham, the Minister of Crathie Kirk and the Chaplain of Windsor Great Park delivered the prayers, and the Archbishop of Canterbury gave the concluding blessing.

Near the end of the service the Imperial State Crown, orb, and sceptre were removed from the coffin and placed on the altar. The King then placed the Queen's Company Camp Colour of the Grenadier Guards on his mother's coffin, before the Lord Chamberlain symbolically broke his wand of office and also placed its halves atop the coffin. After this the Garter Principal King of Arms recited the styles of Elizabeth II and Charles III, between which a lament — "A Salute to the Royal Fendersmith" — was played by the Sovereign's Piper as the Queen's coffin was lowered into the Royal Vault. The singing of the National Anthem marked the end of the ceremony.

Interment
After the funeral of the Queen on 19 September, she was later interred beneath the King George VI Memorial Chapel in a private service attended only by her closest family at 19:30, alongside her father King George VI, her mother Queen Elizabeth, and the ashes of her sister Princess Margaret. The remains of Prince Philip, who was temporarily interred in the Royal Vault following his funeral in 2021, were moved to the chapel after the interment of the Queen.

Elizabeth II's coffin was constructed more than 30 years before the funeral. It is made of English oak and lined with lead to protect the coffin and the remains from moisture damage. Due to the weight of the coffin, eight pallbearers were required for lifting and carrying rather than the usual six.

Organisation and media

Attendees

The service at Westminster Abbey was attended by 2,000 people in total, including holders of the George Cross and Victoria Cross, representatives from the United Kingdom's faith communities, and foreign and Commonwealth heads of state and heads of government. Representatives from 168 countries, out of 193 UN member states and two UN observer states, confirmed attendance, including 18 monarchs, 55 presidents and 25 prime ministers.

Due to the limited number of seats, foreign invitees were asked to keep their delegations as small as possible and to only bring their spouses. The UK government also requested those travelling by air to use commercial flights; private flights were directed away from Heathrow Airport. Additionally, the government asked guests not to use private cars to travel to Westminster Abbey, and instead use government-provided "coach transport from a central assembly point". This was only guidance; leaders including the President of the United States, Joe Biden, the President of Israel, Isaac Herzog, and the Vice President of China, Wang Qishan, were taken to the event through other means. Many dignitaries were present for a reception by the King at Buckingham Palace on the eve of the funeral, and all international guests were invited to attend a reception hosted by the Foreign Secretary, James Cleverly, after the funeral service.

Security

Around 10,000 police officers were expected to be on duty every day in London during the mourning period, a security operation described by the Metropolitan Police as the "biggest the UK has ever seen"; officers from across the country supported the operation under mutual aid agreements. Thames Valley Police announced that they would introduce new water patrols for observing busy waterways in the lead-up to the funeral, and mounted police officers, police dogs, and drones provided part of the security in Windsor. Prior to the service a special unit, the Fixated Threat Assessment Centre, began to monitor and review individuals identified as having a potentially dangerous obsession with the British royal family.

MI5 and GCHQ worked in collaboration with counter terrorism police and the Metropolitan Police to provide security for the funeral. A group of 1,500 military personnel was also deployed, and Westminster was inspected by a military Wildcat helicopter. "Hundreds" of stewards from private security firms were hired to aid crowd management.

Cost and economic impact
The total cost of the funeral has not been published, but it is expected to exceed the £5.4million paid for the funeral of Queen Elizabeth The Queen Mother.

The UK's economy (as measured by GDP) contracted by 0.6 per cent in September 2022, attributable in part due to Elizabeth's funeral and the period of national mourning that preceded it.

Coverage
The funeral and committal service of the Queen were the first to be broadcast to the public. Filming had been prohibited during the state funeral of George VI, although the procession of his coffin was partially televised.

United Kingdom
The funeral was broadcast by the BBC, ITV, and Sky, with the latter two simulcasting the service on all of their channels and not showing advertisements. The BBC Two broadcast included British Sign Language interpretation. BBC Radio broadcast events on Radio 2, 3, 4, 5 Live, the World Service, and its Local Radio network. Global's radio brands also broadcast their own coverage. Channel 5 was the only major public service network that did not air the Queen's funeral.

Big screens were set up at cathedrals and public areas to broadcast the service. Shops, licensed establishments, parish and public halls remained open in Jersey to allow people to watch the Queen's funeral.

Buckingham Palace requested that video footage did not "intrude on the grief" of individual members of the royal family, that footage of the funeral be avoided from usage on entertainment programmes and allowed only for news coverage, and that five short pieces of video featuring members of the royal family would not be broadcast again.

Commonwealth and other countries 
The funeral was broadcast live in Australia, The Bahamas, Canada, India, Mauritius, New Zealand, Singapore, South Africa, and Sri Lanka. The funeral was also carried live by dozens of broadcasters in most of Europe and across the world.

Viewing figures

The television broadcast was the second most watched broadcast during the 21st century in the United Kingdom (after the prime ministerial statement on COVID-19 during the lockdown) and the third most watched royal event in British history (surpassing the wedding of Prince William and Catherine Middleton, and approaching the weddings of Prince Charles and Lady Diana Spencer, and Princess Anne and Mark Philips).

Succession and four-nation tour

Accession 

Upon the Queen's death, her eldest child Charles, Prince of Wales, immediately acceded to the British throne as King Charles III.

There was some speculation regarding the regnal name that would be adopted by the former Prince of Wales upon succeeding his mother. During her formal televised address outside 10 Downing Street, Prime Minister Liz Truss made the first mention of the King's regnal name during a tribute to the Queen. Clarence House officially confirmed the new King would be known as Charles III shortly after the Prime Minister's address. Buckingham Palace released the King's first official statement as monarch at 19:04:

Most of Charles III's pre-accession Scottish titles, as well as the title Duke of Cornwall, were passed to his elder son and the new heir apparent to the throne, Prince William, Duke of Cambridge. On 9 September, William was named Prince of Wales and Earl of Chester, succeeding his father.

The Accession Council assembled on 10 September at St James's Palace to formally proclaim the accession of Charles III. Although about seven hundred people were eligible to attend the ceremony, because the event was planned on such short notice, the number in attendance was two hundred. In addition to other formalities, the Council confirmed "Charles III" as the King's regnal name. At 11:00, 21-gun salutes at the Tower of London, Cardiff Castle, Edinburgh Castle, Castle Cornet, Gibraltar, and naval bases and ships at sea marked the accession of Charles III. The King greeted crowds outside Buckingham Palace after the ceremony.

On 10 September, senior MPs swore an oath of allegiance to Charles III in a special session of Parliament. The King then met with the Prime Minister for a second time and held audiences with members of her cabinet and leaders of the opposition parties.

The coronation of Charles III and Camilla is expected to take place on 6 May 2023 at Westminster Abbey. No plans have been announced for William to be invested as Prince of Wales.

Four-nation royal tour 
King Charles III and Queen Camilla travelled from Balmoral to Buckingham Palace, where they greeted the crowd of mourners outside the gates. The King then held an audience with the Prime Minister before paying tribute to his mother in a publicly broadcast message. In Charles's first address as King he stated that a national period of mourning would be observed until the day after the state funeral (19 September), and an additional seven days would be observed by the royal family, royal household, and troops on ceremonial duties.

On 11 September, the King met the Commonwealth Secretary General at Buckingham Palace, after which he hosted the High Commissioners of Commonwealth realms.

On 12 September, the King travelled to Westminster Hall with the Queen consort to receive condolences from the House of Commons and the House of Lords and to give a speech to both houses. He and the Queen consort then travelled to the Palace of Holyroodhouse in Edinburgh, where they greeted members of the public and viewed floral tributes before the King inspected the Guard of Honour from the Royal Regiment of Scotland. The Ceremony of the Keys followed. The King then had an audience at Holyroodhouse with the First Minister of Scotland, Nicola Sturgeon, and the Presiding Officer of the Scottish Parliament, Alison Johnstone. The King and the Queen consort visited the Scottish Parliament to receive a motion of condolence and observed a two-minute silence with MSPs.

On 13 September, the King and the Queen consort travelled to Northern Ireland, where they met with members of the public in Royal Hillsborough before arriving at the Castle. The King met the Secretary of State for Northern Ireland, Chris Heaton-Harris, and party leaders, and the Speaker of the Northern Ireland Assembly, Alex Maskey, delivered a message of condolence. The King and the Queen consort also met with major faith leaders in Northern Ireland. A service of reflection was held in St Anne's Cathedral in Belfast on 13 September, where John McDowell, the Archbishop of Armagh and head of the Church of Ireland, paid tribute to the Queen for her efforts in bringing peace to Ireland. The service was attended by the King and Queen consort, the Prime Minister, the President of Ireland, Michael D. Higgins, and the Taoiseach, Micheál Martin. A delegation from the republican Sinn Féin also attended, but the party did not take part in any events marking the accession.

On 16 September, the King and Queen consort visited Cardiff Castle, where a royal gun salute was fired and crowds gathered inside. A silent protest against the monarchy was held outside by groups including trade unions, and Labour for an Independent Wales. An audience was held for the First Minister of Wales and the Llywydd, or Presiding Officer, of the Senedd. A service of prayer and reflection for the life of the Queen was held at Llandaff Cathedral on 16 September and attended by the King and Queen consort. The Bishop of Llandaff and leaders of other faiths said the prayers, and the Archbishop of Wales delivered an address in both English and Welsh. The service included the singing of Welsh hymns and anthems. The choir accompanied by harpists Alis Huws and Catrin Finch performed the anthem "A Welsh Prayer" composed by Paul Mealor with words by Grahame Davies.

At the Senedd the King received a motion of condolence before addressing the parliament in Welsh and English. At Cardiff Castle, the King had audiences with the First Minister of Wales, Mark Drakeford, and the Llywydd, Elin Jones. At the castle, they also held audiences with individuals associated with their royal patronages, before meeting with members of the public in the castle grounds. Returning to London, the King met leaders of different faith communities at Buckingham Palace.

On 17 September, the King met with the Defence Chiefs of Staff at Buckingham Palace and received the Prime Ministers of Australia, the Bahamas, Canada, Jamaica, and New Zealand. The governors-general of the Commonwealth realms attended a reception and lunch at Buckingham Palace, hosted by the King and other members of the royal family. The King met emergency services workers at the Metropolitan Police's Special Operations Room in Lambeth, who were organising aspects of the Queen's state funeral. He also visited The Queue with Prince William to speak to its participants.

On 18 September, the King met the prime ministers of Tuvalu, Antigua and Barbuda, and Papua New Guinea at Buckingham Palace. A reception for world leaders was held at Buckingham Palace.

Other activities
On 10 September, a service at Crathie Kirk was attended by Anne and her husband Sir Timothy Laurence, Andrew, Edward and his wife Sophie, and the Queen's grandchildren Peter Phillips, Zara Tindall, Beatrice, Eugenie, and Louise Windsor, who then viewed floral tributes outside Balmoral. The King's sons, William and Harry, along with their wives, Catherine and Meghan, viewed floral tributes outside Windsor Castle.

On 15 September, members of the royal family viewed tributes and met crowds around the UK. The Prince and Princess of Wales visited Sandringham House, the Earl and Countess of Wessex visited Manchester, and Princess Anne and Sir Timothy Laurence travelled to Glasgow.

On 16 September, the Prince and Princess of Wales visited the Army Training Centre Pirbright to meet with troops deployed from Canada, Australia, and New Zealand that would take part in the state funeral. The Earl and Countess of Wessex met with members of the public and viewed tributes at Windsor Castle.

On 17 September, the Earl and Countess of Wessex met with crowds outside Buckingham Palace. On 18 September, the Princess of Wales held an audience with Olena Zelenska, the First Lady of Ukraine.

On 22 September, the Prince and Princess of Wales visited the Windsor Guildhall and the Princess Royal visited HMNB Portsmouth, respectively, to thank volunteers and staff and the Royal Navy for their role in organising the state funeral.

Reactions

Charles III paid tribute to his "darling Mama" in an address to the UK and Commonwealth on 9 September. On 9 September, all flags at royal residences were ordered to be lowered to half-mast except the Royal Standard, which continued to fly at full mast wherever the current monarch was in residence. All royal residences were closed to the public until after the state funeral had occurred. An online book of condolence was set up by the royal website. In a written statement on 18 September, the King thanked the public for their support, and a previously unseen photograph of the Queen from May 2022 was published by the Palace.

On 9 September, the UK government published guidance on details surrounding the national mourning period, stating that businesses, public service, sports fixtures and public venues were not obliged to close. A 96-gun salute was fired in Hyde Park by the King's Troop, Royal Horse Artillery, at the Tower of London by the Honourable Artillery Company, at Edinburgh Castle by the Royal Artillery, at Cardiff Castle and Stonehenge by the 104th Regiment Royal Artillery, at Caernarfon Castle, at York Museum Gardens, and on board Royal Navy ships. Bells tolled at Westminster Abbey, St Paul's Cathedral, and other churches across the UK, Australia, The Bahamas, and Canada. At Windsor Castle the Sebastopol Bell, which is only rung to mark the deaths of senior royals, tolled 96 times to mark the years of the Queen's life.

Politicians throughout the Commonwealth paid tribute to the Queen, praising her long public service. Motions of condolences were also passed in the legislatures of Australia, Canada, New Zealand, and Sri Lanka. A resolution of condolence was also passed in the Senate of the Philippines, which was later handed over to the British ambassador. Other political figures in the rest of the world also offered their condolences and tributes, as did members of royal families, religious leaders and other public figures. 

A service of prayer and mourning was held at St Paul's Cathedral at 18:00 on 9 September, attended by senior politicians and 2,000 members of the public. The ceremony marked the first official rendition of "God Save the King" under Charles's reign.

Many organisations paid their respects, and some suspended operations or cancelled events. BBC, ITV, and Channel 4 interrupted television programming to cover the news, while print media dedicated entire front covers in tribute. Sporting events that went ahead held minute silences.

Other commemorations

Instructions to fly national flags at half-mast were issued in several countries. In Commonwealth realms like Antigua and Barbuda, Australia, the Bahamas, Belize, Canada, Grenada, Jamaica, New Zealand, Papua New Guinea, Saint Kitts and Nevis, Saint Lucia, Saint Vincent and the Grenadines, and Solomon Islands, national flags were flown at half-mast until the date of the funeral; with the exception of Proclamation Day when flags were returned to full mast. Several other countries also issued instructions to fly their national flags at half-mast, including Sri Lanka, the United States, and many European Union buildings. White flags were also put up in Galle Face Green and other prominent places throughout Sri Lanka.

Several Commonwealth countries also declared the Queen's funeral or a specific day as a national holiday, including Antigua and Barbuda, Australia, The Bahamas, Belize, Canada, the Cook Islands, Nauru, New Zealand, Niue, Papua New Guinea, and Sri Lanka. In addition to the service in the United Kingdom, memorial services were held in other Commonwealth realms, including Belize, Grenada, and Tuvalu. Thanksgiving and memorial services were also held in Anglican churches across the world, including Holy Trinity Cathedral in Accra, St Andrew's Church at Bandar Seri Begawan in Brunei, Cathedral of Christ the Living Saviour in Colombo, St. John's Cathedral in Hong Kong, and All Saints Cathedral in Nairobi.

Many landmarks were illuminated in either purple or royal blue colours to honour the Queen, or illuminated with the name or image of Elizabeth II, her royal cypher, or the Union Flag; including landmarks in Australia, Bosnia and Herzegovina, Brazil, Canada, the Czech Republic, Germany, Israel, Kuwait, New Zealand, the United Arab Emirates, the United Kingdom, and the United States. Several landmarks in Canada, France, New Zealand, and the United Kingdom were also dimmed or had their lighting shut off as a sign of respect.

Moments of silence were held across several Commonwealth realms. Several institutions also held moments of silence, including the Dáil Éireann, the Parliament of Sri Lanka, and by the Airborne Commemorations Foundation in the Netherlands.

Flowers, tributes and wreaths were left at British embassies, including Berlin and Jakarta.

Antigua and Barbuda 
Antigua and Barbuda hosted a service of thanksgiving in honour of the late Queen of Antigua and Barbuda on 19 September, which was declared a public holiday throughout the country. The Governor-General's Deputy, Sir Clare Roberts, and the Acting Prime Minister Steadroy Benjamin presided in the absence of Sir Rodney Williams and Gaston Browne, who were both present at the Queen's state funeral in London. The service took place at the Cathedral of St John The Divine and was officiated by Dwane Cassius, Dean of the Cathedral of the Anglican Diocese of the North East Caribbean and Aruba.

The service was followed by a parade of members of the Antigua and Barbuda Defence Force and the Royal Police Force of Antigua and Barbuda. The parade commenced from the Long Street entrance of the cathedral and concluded at the APUA Telephone Exchange, where the parade was dismissed.

Australia 
A 96-gun salute was fired by Australia's Federation Guard on the forecourt of Parliament House in Canberra on 9 September to mark the passing of the Queen of Australia.

Monuments and landmarks across the country were lit up to honour the Queen. The Sydney Opera House was illuminated with an image of Queen Elizabeth II on the nights of 9 and 10 September, as a symbolic gesture on behalf of the Government of New South Wales. The Australian Parliament House was lit up with images of the Queen throughout her seven-decade reign, reflecting her long and deep relationship with Australia. The Government of Western Australia also announced that landmarks across Perth, the capital city of Western Australia, would be illuminated "royal purple" as a mark of respect for the Queen.

A national memorial service for the Queen took place on 22 September at Parliament House in Canberra. The National Day of Mourning was observed as a "one-off public holiday". One minute's silence was observed at 11:00 across Australia. Plans were announced for a new public square in central Sydney bearing the late Queen's name.

Bahamas
A state memorial service for Elizabeth II, Queen of the Bahamas, was held at Christ Church Cathedral in Nassau on 2 October. A procession of parliamentarians and law enforcement officers preceded the service, which started at Rawson Square, Bay Street. Governor General Sir Cornelius A. Smith, and Prime Minister Philip Davis were among those who addressed the congregation.

Bhutan
Upon royal command, special prayers were performed in all major dzongs, temples and monasteries across Bhutan. King Jigme Khesar Namgyel Wangchuck and Queen Jetsun Pema offered 1,000 butterlamps at Samtse on 9 September for Elizabeth II. Special prayers to offer light (called marme moenlam) were held at the ceremony, which was attended by the prime minister, government officials, and thousands of people in Samtse. Thongdrels of Guru Rinpoche and Zhabdrung were unfurled for the ceremony, to sanctify the important occasion.

In Thimphu, former King Jigme Singye and members of the royal family were joined by government officials and foreign dignitaries to offer 1,000 butter lamps and prayers at the Grand Kuenrey of the Tashichhodzong.

Canada 

Various locations were illuminated in honour of the late Queen of Canada as a part of the Department of Canadian Heritage's national illumination initiative. The Canadian government also announced a donation of C$20 million to the Queen Elizabeth Scholars program, a program that funds Canadian university exchange programs. 

Prime Minister Justin Trudeau announced that the date of the Queen's funeral would be a holiday for federal government employees. Among the Canadian provinces and territories, Prince Edward Island was the only one to declare the date of Elizabeth II's funeral a statutory holiday. Alberta, the Northwest Territories, Saskatchewan, Manitoba, Ontario and Quebec declared a day of mourning or commemoration instead of a holiday. In the remaining provinces and territories government offices closed, some also closed schools, and observance was optional for private-sector businesses. The Retail Council of Canada and Canadian Federation of Independent Business were against making the funeral a statutory paid holiday.

A national commemorative ceremony for Elizabeth II took place at the Christ Church Cathedral in Ottawa on 19 September, which was broadcast live on television as well as on social media. The ceremony was preceded by a parade of the Canadian Armed Forces and Royal Canadian Mounted Police through downtown Ottawa, from Cartier Square Drill Hall and past Parliament Hill to the Cathedral, with a 96-gun salute. A flypast by the Royal Canadian Air Force was cancelled due to inclement weather. The congregation was addressed by former Governor-General Adrienne Clarkson as well as former Prime Minister Brian Mulroney.

Provincial commemorative services took place in several Canadian provinces on 19 September: in Alberta, British Columbia, Manitoba, New Brunswick, Newfoundland and Labrador, Nova Scotia, Prince Edward Island, and Saskatchewan. In Ontario, a memorial service was held in Toronto on 20 September. Two memorial services in Quebec were organized by the Anglican Church rather than the provincial government, which were attended by Lieutenant Governor Michel Doyon. 

Moments of silence were held across several provinces on 19 September, with several transit operators having paused their operations for 96 seconds to coincide with the provincial moment of silence. Two British-made bronze cannons from 1810, were fired in Westmount, Quebec, in honour of Elizabeth II.

Fiji 

The Holy Trinity Anglican Cathedral in Suva hosted a special Service of Remembrance and Thanksgiving on 16 September in memory of the Queen. The service was attended by hundreds, including President Ratu Wiliame Katonivere and First Lady Filomena, Parliament Speaker Ratu Epeli Nailatikau, Minister for Health Ifereimi Waqainabete, former Prime Minister Sitiveni Rabuka, Police Commissioner Brigadier-General Sitiveni Qiliho, Head of the Catholic Church in Fiji Archbishop Peter Loy Chong, members of the diplomatic corps and the public. During the service, the Republic of Fiji Military Services accorded The Last Post, signalling the end of the Queen's 70-year reign.

On 20 September, President Ratu Wiliame Katonivere hosted a Commemoration and Thanksgiving Service for the Queen at State House in Suva, which was attended by senior officials, government ministers, members of parliament and foreign representatives. The President reflected on the Queen's six visits to Fiji, which he said symbolized strong solidarity between Fiji and the royal family.

France 
French postal service La Poste issued a book of four collector stamps featuring the Queen. 50,000 stamps were put on sale on the day of the Queen's funeral.

Starting from 14 October, Le Touquet's local airport was renamed Le Touquet-Paris-Plage Elizabeth II to honour the Queen. In Paris, the George V Métro station, on Line 1 under the Champs-Élysées, was renamed Elizabeth II for the day of the Queen's state funeral.

Hong Kong 

Thousands in Hong Kong paid tribute to the Queen, who was the colonial head of the city for 45 years before handover in 1997. Long queues were seen outside the British consulate for days after the announcement of the death and until the funeral, with mourners waiting up to four hours. More than 13,000 signed the condolence books in the consulate in 11 days, eulogising the "boss lady", an affectionate nickname for the Queen by the Hongkongers. The tribute, which was one of the largest public gathering after imposition of the national security law and the crackdown on democracy movement, was also regarded as a protest to Hong Kong and Chinese authorities and mourning the past.

Eric Chan, Chief Secretary for Administration and second-highest-ranking official in the city, visited the consulate and signed the condolence book on behalf of the government. Nevertheless, the pro-Beijing newspaper Ta Kung Pao accused a "minority" of Hong Kong mourners for "indulging in this fantasy that they are subjects of the British Empire", and called for the eradication of colonialism.

On the day of the Queen's funeral, hundreds gathered outside the consulate watching a live broadcast of the event. A harmonica player was arrested under colonial-era sedition law after playing "Glory to Hong Kong", a protest song prominently used in the 2019–2020 Hong Kong protests, and "God Save the King".

Jamaica 

Following the announcement of the passing of the Queen of Jamaica on 8 September 2022, bells were tolled nationally in churches throughout all parish capitals for one hour beginning at 6:00 pm. Books of condolence were established at King's House, and in the Offices of the Custodes in all parishes during the mourning period. A 96-gun salute was fired by the Jamaica Defence Force at Up Park Camp in St Andrew on 19 September.

A national memorial service for the late Queen of Jamaica was held on 2 October at the St. Andrew Parish Church in Kingston and was attended by government officials and foreign representatives. The service was headed by Governor-General Sir Patrick Allen, Prime Minister Andrew Holness, and Mark Golding, the leader of the official opposition, headed the service. The service included scripture readings by the governor-general, the prime minister and the leader of the opposition, as well as tributes in songs by the church choir and the Kingston College Choir.

Apart from the national memorial service in Kingston, services were held on 2 October in Clarendon, Saint Catherine, Saint Ann, Portland, Saint Mary, Saint Thomas, Saint Elizabeth, Saint James, Westmoreland, Hanover, Manchester, and Trelawny. The custodes and mayors headed the memorial services in parishes across Jamaica.

Kenya 
In Kenya, former staff returned to the Treetops Hotel, the building where Elizabeth learned about the death of her father and her accession to the throne, to light candles and lay out a condolence book.

New Zealand 

A 96-gun salute was fired from the Te Papa Promenade in Wellington on 9 September, by personnel from the 16th Field Regiment, Royal New Zealand Artillery based at Linton Military Camp, to mark the passing of the Queen of New Zealand.

At the Auckland War Memorial Museum, a haka was led by members of the Limited Service Volunteer programme to honour the Queen.

A state memorial service with a one-off public holiday took place on 26 September to celebrate the life and reign of Queen Elizabeth II of New Zealand. The service took place at the Wellington Cathedral of St Paul at 14:00 and was televised and live-streamed. A national minute of silence took place at the beginning of the service, with people across New Zealand being invited to participate in the moment of silence. During the service, the Queen's Personal New Zealand Flag was paraded for the last time.

Memorial services were also held elsewhere in New Zealand including in Auckland, Christchurch, New Plymouth and Hastings. South Canterbury Anniversary Day, which was due to be observed on 26 September in the Timaru, Waimate and Mackenzie districts, was moved to Friday 11 November.

Cook Islands 

The King's Representative, Sir Tom Marsters, proclaimed 30 September a public holiday in the Cook Islands in respect of the Queen's passing. On the morning of the holiday, the government held a memorial service for the Queen at the National Auditorium in Avarua. The service was attended by Marsters, traditional leaders, members of the Religious Advisory Council, Queen's Award recipients, the high commissioners of New Zealand and Australia, Members of Parliament, members of the various uniform organisations, and members of the public.

Niue 
Two days of commemoration took place in Niue to mark the passing of Queen Elizabeth II, Niue's head of state. A series of events took place on 18 and 19 September, with the latter being a public holiday. On 19 September, a national memorial service was held at the Taoga Niue starting at 08:00. A national moment of reflection took place at 08:15, with people across Niue taking part. People were also asked to plant a tree on 19 September in memory of the Queen.

Papua New Guinea 
On 12 September, a 96-gun salute was fired in honour of the Queen, and a moment of silence took place outside Parliament House in Port Moresby.

On 18 September, members of various Anglican Church parishes in Port Moresby gathered at St Martin's Anglican parish for a memorial service for the late Queen of Papua New Guinea, which was presided over by the Bishop of Popondota, Lindsley Ihove.

Saint Lucia 

On 9 September, a 96-gun salute was fired by the Royal Saint Lucia Police Force on the premises of Government House in Castries.

On 19 September, the day of the state funeral, the public was invited to pause for a 70-second national tribute to reflect on the life and legacy of Elizabeth II, Queen of Saint Lucia. Church bells and sirens from fire stations throughout the nation sounded for one minute and 10 seconds starting at 09:59 to herald the commencement of the 70-second reflection period at 10:00.

Slovakia
A place of remembrance for Elizabeth II was created by Servare et Manere in the Carl Gustav Swensson Park in Žilina. The memorial is located near the first tree planted for The Queen's Green Canopy in Central Europe. In the biblical garden at Vysoká nad Kysucou, Elizabeth II was publicly honoured with the planting of the Queen Elizabeth rose. The rose planting was a part of the official opening for the gardens and was organized by the Vysoká nad Kysucou Roman Catholic Parish in cooperation with Servare et Manere.

Solomon Islands 
In the Solomon Islands the prime minister declared 12–14 September as days of mourning, and the first a public holiday. The three-day national mourning period began on 12 September with a wreath-laying and signing of the condolence book at Government House by national leaders including Governor-General Sir David Vunagi, Prime Minister Manasseh Sogavare, Speaker of the National Parliament Patterson Oti and Chief Justice Sir Albert Palmer; as well as other government officials, former governors-general and prime ministers, members of diplomatic missions and uniformed groups.

A memorial church service was held at the Saint Barnabas Anglican Cathedral on 14 September to celebrate the life and reign of Elizabeth II, Queen of Solomon Islands. The service was attended by acting Governor-General Patteson John Oti, Prime Minister Manasseh Sogavare, Deputy Speaker Commins Mewa, Chief Justice Sir Albert Palmer, former governors-general, acting British High Commissioner Steve Auld and senior government officials.

Sweden
Sweden honoured the Queen, who was one of the longest-serving members of the Royal Order of the Seraphim, the foremost order of Sweden, on the day of her funeral on 19 September. The Queen was awarded the order by King Gustaf VI Adolf on 26 May 1953, and the chain of the Order was given to her by King Carl XVI Gustaf on 23 May 1975. The Queen was the 722nd member of the Order since its inception in 1748. The Queen's royal coat of arms as a member of the Royal Order of the Seraphim was then taken in procession from the palace to Riddarholmen Church in Stockholm, where the bourdon rang a traditional Seraphim Toll for one hour. The arms were then hung in the church. By command of the King of Sweden, flags above royal residences were flown at half-mast on the day.

United Kingdom 

The billboards at Piccadilly Circus and on the BT Tower showed tributes to the Queen, as well as advertising screens on the side of bus stops on billboards across the entire country.

The Royal Mail issued four commemorative stamps showing the Queen at different stages in her life.

Black cab drivers of London lined The Mall to pay tribute to the Queen.

United States 
Billboards on the Las Vegas Strip showed images of the Queen.

On 21 September, a memorial service was held at the Washington National Cathedral, arranged in conjunction with the British Embassy in Washington, D.C.. Attendees included Vice President Kamala Harris, House Speaker Nancy Pelosi and House Minority Leader Kevin McCarthy, as well as British ambassador Karen Pierce. All living former US presidents were invited, but none attended. A sermon was delivered by Michael Curry, the presiding bishop of the Episcopal Church.

See also 
 State funerals in the United Kingdom
 List of largest funerals

Notes

References

External links 

Announcements and arrangements
 Announcement of the death of The Queen – The Royal Household
 Arrangements for the Funeral of Her Majesty The Queen – The Royal Household
 The State Funeral and Committal Service for Her Majesty The Queen – The Royal Household
 The State Funeral of Her Majesty The Queen – The Royal Household
Service of thanksgiving, lying-in-state, state funeral and committal service
 Service of Thanksgiving for the life of The Queen – The Royal Family (YouTube video)
 In full: Service of reflection held at St Giles' Cathedral in Edinburgh – Sky News (YouTube video)
 Order of Service for the Service of Thanksgiving for the life of The Queen
 Service for the reception of the coffin at Westminster Hall – The Royal Family (YouTube video)
 Queen lies in state at Westminster – Sky News (YouTube video)
 King Charles visits Northern Ireland for first time as monarch – Sky News (YouTube video)
 Order of Service for the Service of Reflection for the Life of Her Majesty Queen Elizabeth II
 King Charles attends service of prayer and reflection in Wales – Sky News (YouTube video)
 Order of Service for the Service of Prayer and Reflection for the life of Her Majesty Queen Elizabeth II
 State Funeral for Her Majesty The Queen – The Royal Family (YouTube video)
 Committal Service for Her Majesty The Queen – The Royal Family (YouTube video)
 The State Funeral of HM Queen Elizabeth II – BBC (YouTube video)
 In Full: Queen Elizabeth II's funeral procession, service and committal – The Telegraph (YouTube video)
 Order of Service for the State Funeral of Her Majesty Queen Elizabeth II
 Order of Service for the Committal of Her Majesty Queen Elizabeth II
Government websites
 Her Majesty Queen Elizabeth II – UK Government
 Commemoration for Her Majesty Queen Elizabeth II – Government of Canada
 Her Majesty The Queen – Australian Government
 Queen Elizabeth II – New South Wales Government
 Queen Elizabeth II – Queensland Government
 Her Majesty the Queen – Government of South Australia
 Her Majesty the Queen, 1926 - 2022 – Government of Western Australia
 Death of Her Majesty the Queen – Governor-General of New Zealand

 
2022 in London
2022 in Scotland
2020s in Berkshire
2020s in Edinburgh
21st century in Aberdeenshire
Articles containing video clips
Elizabeth II
European court festivities
Events involving British royalty
Elizabeth II
September 2022 events in the United Kingdom
+
Windsor Castle